Jackie Gene Brown (May 31, 1943 – January 8, 2017) was an American professional baseball pitcher and coach, who played in Major League Baseball (MLB) for the Washington Senators / Texas Rangers, Cleveland Indians, and Montreal Expos from 1970 –1977. Brown threw and batted right-handed. His older brother, Paul Brown, also pitched in the big leagues.

In 7 seasons he had a 47–53 win–loss record, 214 games (105 started), 26 complete games, 8 shutouts, 39 games finished, 3 saves, 892 innings pitched, 934 hits allowed, 460 runs allowed, 415 earned runs allowed, 82 home runs allowed, 353 walks, 516 strikeouts, 20 hit batsmen, 28 wild pitches, 3,865 batters faced, 24 intentional walks, 1 balk, a 4.18 earned run average (ERA), and a 1.442 WHIP.

Brown was dealt from the Indians to the Expos for Andre Thornton on December 10, 1976. In his final season, he was the winning pitcher on Opening Day, defeating Steve Carlton, in Philadelphia and also pitched in the first Expos game ever played at Olympic Stadium.

After his playing career, Brown was a pitching coach for the Texas Rangers (1979–82), Chicago White Sox (1992–95), and Tampa Bay Devil Rays (2002); he also was a minor league pitching coordinator and pitching coach in a number of organizations.

References

External links

Jackie Brown at Pura Pelota (Venezuelan Professional Baseball League)

 
 
 

1943 births
2017 deaths
Águilas del Zulia players
American expatriate baseball players in Canada
Bakersfield Bears players
Baseball coaches from Oklahoma
Baseball players from Oklahoma
Burlington Senators players
Cardenales de Lara players
American expatriate baseball players in Venezuela
Chicago White Sox coaches
Cleveland Indians players
Denver Bears players
Florida Instructional League Senators players
Macon Peaches players
Major League Baseball pitchers
Major League Baseball pitching coaches
Miami Marlins (FSL) players
Montreal Expos players
People from Holdenville, Oklahoma
Savannah Senators players
Spartanburg Phillies players
Spokane Indians players
Tampa Bay Devil Rays coaches
Texas Rangers coaches
Texas Rangers players
Tidewater Tides players
Tucson Toros players
Washington Senators (1961–1971) players